Xi'an Xiguan Airport  was the airport serving Xi'an, capital of China's Shaanxi Province.  It was closed on 1 September 1991, when all flights were transferred to the new Xi'an Xianyang International Airport.

History
The Xi'an Xiguan Airfield was built in 1924 under the directives of Zhang Xueliang of the Fengtian Army, and as the Chinese warlord battles raged, Feng Yuxiang and Yan Xishan sought to subjugate the Nationalist government of Generalissimo Chiang Kai-shek; the Young Marshall however sided with the Nationalists, and the Nationalist Chinese Air Force units began their stationing at Xi'an Xiguan Airfield, specifically the 6th Reconnaissance-Attack/Scout-Attack Group composed of O2U-1 light-attack/scout-bombers in 1929–30, which were deployed in the Central Plains War. During the War of Resistance-World War II, the airport was known as Hsian Airfield and was used by the United States Army Air Forces Fourteenth Air Force as part of the China Defensive Campaign (1942–1945). The Americans used the airport primarily as a photo-reconnaissance airfield, with unarmed P-38 Lightnings, equipped with aerial cameras flew over Japanese-held territory providing intelligence to the Chinese ground forces.   In addition, P-61 Black Widow night interceptor aircraft flew from the airport, providing defense against night bombing raids by the Japanese, along with P-47 Thunderbolts day fighters and C-47 Skytrain transports flying in supplies and ammunition to support friendly forces in the area.  The Americans closed their facilities at the airport after the end of the war in September 1945.

By the 1980s, the airport was too small to handle rapid increase of local and foreign tourists and the terminal grew inadequate and the airport could no longer expand. On September 1, 1991, the airport was closed and all the flights and vehicles left at the airport were transferred to the new Xianyang Airport. The site of the airport was then converted into a civil park.

Former airlines and destinations 
Some Airlines operated in Xi'an Xiguan Airport in the 1970s and 1980s, particularly Chinese airlines, such as CAAC. Before 1991, it was also a hub for China Northwest Airlines.

See also

List of airports in China
List of defunct international airports

References

Defunct airports in China
Airports established in 1924
Airports disestablished in 1991
1924 establishments in China
1991 disestablishments in China
Airports in Shaanxi
Transport in Xi'an
Buildings and structures in Xi'an
Airfields of the United States Army Air Forces in China
Airfields of the United States Army Air Forces Air Transport Command in the China-Burma-India Theater